Cinevilla is a backlot in Slampe parish in the Tukums Municipality in Latvia, and was created for the outdoor shootings of the feature film Defenders of Riga. It is the only backlot in Latvia, and consists of replicas of historical buildings and constructions of Riga, the capital of Latvia. The backlot has a small canal to resemble the Daugava river quays of the Riga old town. The Stone Bridge is also there as well as the historical Lübeck and Pontoon bridges.

Cinevilla is now a major tourist attraction, and is the only such large-scale open-air cinema exhibition in the Baltic States. In 2008, Jānis Streičs shot the film Rudolf's Gold on the lot, simulating a Kurzeme farmstead.

References

External links

Official site 
 Cinevilla at vietas.lv

Buildings and structures in Latvia
Cinema of Latvia